A bromance is a close but non-sexual relationship between two or more men.

Bromance may also refer to:

 "Bromance" (Avicii song), a 2010 single by Swedish DJ and producer Avicii, working under the stage name Tim Berg
 Bromance (American TV series), a 2008 American reality series that aired on MTV
 Bromance (Taiwanese TV series), a 2015 Taiwan drama series
 Bromantic comedy, a film genre